Nemacheilus cleopatra is a species of ray-finned fish in the genus Nemacheilus which is known only from the Đà Rằng River in central Vietnam.

Footnotes 

 

C
Fish described in 2001